Santarém is a goat cheese from Portugal produced in several different regions, most notably in the Santarém district and in Serra de Santo António in the Ribatejo province of Portugal. 

It is considered to taste best ripe after aging, in servings of between 50 grams to 100 grams. Best production practices call for its being preserved in good quality edible oil.

See also
 List of goat milk cheeses

References

Portuguese cheeses
Goat's-milk cheeses